<noinclude>

Sindh Barrage is a proposed project in Sindh, Pakistan that will be constructed on the River Indus in between the Kotri Barrage and the Indus River outfall into the Arabian Sea.

The barrage site is proposed to be located about 30 km upstream the Indus River outfall from the Arabian Sea, 10 km east of Baghan village, 75 km south of Thatta city & 105 km east of Karachi city in the province of Sindh. The plan is to construct a twelve meter high barrage with dykes on both banks in flood plain that would be four to nine metres high. The reservoir in flood plain from the barrage would be 160km upstream to prevent sea intrusion into the Indus River. There will be two canals on each side for irrigation and drinking water in the coastal area up to Dhabeji and Tharparkar. The project study will be completed in September 2021 and construction work is expected to start in January, 2022 and will finish December, 2024 and will cost about 125 billion Pakistani Rupees or about 750 million US Dollars. The barrage will irrigate about 55,000 acres of land that has been lost due to desertification and high soil salinity. The barrage will also bring farming and agriculture production back to these desolated areas and help facilitate the diminishing maritime flora and fauna.

See also
 List of barrages and headworks in Pakistan
 List of dams and reservoirs in Pakistan
 List of power stations in Pakistan

References

External links 

WAPDA: Sindh barrage project status

Dams in Sindh
Tidal barrages
Irrigation projects
Irrigation in Pakistan
Proposed dams
Dams on the Indus River